The Styx River is a river in the western portion of Central Queensland, Australia.

The headwaters of the river rise on the Gilberton Plateau in the Einasleigh Uplands, part of the Atherton Tableland in the Great Dividing Range. The river flows generally south by southwest through the Blackbraes National Park before reaching its confluence with the Gilbert River below Conical Hill. The river descends  over its  course.

See also

References

Rivers of Queensland
Central Queensland